The Voice Kids is a Polish reality music talent show for aspiring singers aged 8 to 15. Airing on the TVP 2 television network, this is part of the international syndication The Voice based on the reality singing competition launched in the Netherlands as The Voice Kids, created by Dutch television producer John de Mol. Tomson and Baron and Dawid Kwiatkowski again took over as trainers. Cleo joined them, replacing Edyta Górniak. The leaders remained unchanged. The second season premiered on New Year's Day 2019 and was won by 14-year-old Anna Dąbrowska from Wesoła. This marked Cleo's first win.

Coaches

Teams 
 Colour key

Blind auditions 
Color key

Episode 1 (January 1, 2019) 
Roksana Węgiel, Zuza Jabłońska and 4Dreamers performed "Nie Poddam Się" at the start of the show.

Episode 2 (January 1, 2019) 
Roksana Węgiel performed "Obiecuję" at the start of the show.

Episode 3 (January 5, 2019)

Episode 4 (January 5, 2019)

Episode 5 (January 12, 2019) 
Zuza Jabłońska performed "Ślad" at the start of the show.

Episode 6 (January 12, 2019)

Episode 7 (January 19, 2019)

Episode 8 (January 19, 2019)

Episode 9 (January 26, 2019)

Episode 10 (January 26, 2019)

The Battle Rounds
Color key

Episode 11: Team Tomson & Baron (February 2, 2019) 
The Tomson & Baron's group performed "Zaufaj" at the start of the show.

Sing offs

Episode 12: Team Cleo (February 9, 2019) 
The Cleo's group performed "Łowcy Gwiazd" at the start of the show.

Sing offs

Episode 13: Team Dawid Kwiatkowski (February 16, 2019) 
The Dawid's group performed "Rozpalimy ogień" at the start of the show.

Sing offs

Episode 14 Finale (23 February) 
Color key

Round 1

Round 2
Each contestant performed a duet with their judge and their original song.

Elimination chart 
Colour key
Artist's info

Result details

Teams
Color key
Artist's info

Results details

References

Kids series 2
2019 Polish television seasons